Clube de Futebol Os Belenenses, commonly known as Belenenses, is a Portuguese sports club founded in 1919. It is based in the Belém parish of Lisbon.

Current squad
As of 9 September 2016

References

External links
 
 Os Belenenses on zeroazero.pt 

Women's football clubs in Portugal
C.F. Os Belenenses
Sport in Lisbon